Aswan University is a university located in  Aswan, Egypt. Established in 2012, it was previously known as the Aswan branch of the South Valley University.

History 
Aswan University branch was established in 1974 as a branch of Assiut University. The study started on October of the academic year 1973/1974 in the faculty of education and the first bachelor was given in 1978 then started the enrollment in master degree in the faculty of science in the academic year 1977/1978 after that the enrollment in Ph.D. started in the academic year 1977/1978. In 1995 the presidential decree no. 23 of 1995 was issued to establish South Valley University and then Aswan branch was affiliated to it, new faculties were established (faculty of arts – faculty of social work – faculty of engineering).

In 2012 Aswan University was constructed as a governmental university by the presidential decree no. 311 in 2012 and it now included 15 faculties (the faculties of arts, education, science, social work, engineering, energy engineering, veterinary medicine, agriculture, nursing, languages and translation, medicine, fisheries technology, commerce, specific education, and archaeology).

Campus

Main campus 
The university main campus is located in Sahary City, Airport Road which occupies 400 acres.

New campus 
In addition to the new headquarters in Aswan Al-Gadeda that occupies 98.5 acres. Aswan university includes 6 headquarters and 6 university dorms in Aswan City.

Faculties

Humanities faculties 
 Faculty of Arts
 Faculty of Commerce
 Faculty of Dar El-Ulum
 Faculty of Al-Alsun
 Faculty of Social Work
 Faculty of Education
 Faculty of Physical Education
 Faculty of Law
 Faculty of Specialized Education
 Faculty of Archaeology

Scientific faculties 
 Faculty of Engineering
 Faculty of Energy Engineering
 Faculty of Medicine
 Faculty of Agriculture
 Faculty of Science
 Faculty of Nursing
 Faculty of Veterinary Medicine
 Faculty of Fish & Fisheries Technology

Faculties under construction 
 Faculty of Oral and Dental Medicine 
 Faculty of Tourism and Hotel Management

Institutes 

 Institute of Nursing Education 
 Institute of African Research and Studies

References

External links 
 Official Website.
 
 

Universities in Egypt
Educational institutions established in 2012
2012 establishments in Egypt